Blowfly's Party is the 1980 album by Clarence Reid as his alter ego Blowfly. It was released on the Weird World Records label, a subsidiary of T.K. Records. This album featured a reworked version of the classic "Rap Dirty" and also managed to chart in the US pop albums chart at No. 82 and on the Black Albums chart at No. 26.

The album was originally released under the name Blowfly's Disco Party but was reissued under the alternate title to avoid confusion with the 1977 album Disco.

Track listing

Personnel  
 Blowfly  – Vocals, producer
 Benny Latimore - Keyboards 
 George "Chocolate" Perry - Bass
 Jerome Smith - Guitar
 Little Beaver - Guitar
 Mike Lewis Orchestra - Strings, horns
 Rich Finch - Bass
 Robert Ferguson - Drums
 Timmy Thomas - Keyboards
 Wildfire - Backing vocals

References

External links
RateYourMusic
Discogs
Henry Stone Official Website
Official Blowfly Discography

1980 albums
Blowfly (musician) albums